Marie Maitland (born about 1550, died 1596) was a Scottish writer believed to be the transcriber of the Quarto Volume of the Maitland Manuscripts, an important source for the Scots literature of the Fifteenth and Sixteenth Centuries. She recorded and preserved her father's extensive writings as his sight became increasingly poor, eventually resulting in his blindness.

Early life 

Mary Maitland was the daughter of Sir Richard Maitland of Lethington and Thirlestane (1496–1586) and Mariotta (or Margaret) Cranstoun (died 1586), the daughter of Sir Thomas Cranstoun of Corsbie, Berwickshire, Scotland.

Mary had three brothers and three sisters. Her eldest brother, William Maitland of Lethington (died 1573), was Secretary to Mary, Queen of Scots. Her second eldest brother was John Maitland, 1st Lord Maitland of Thirlestane (1543-1595), Lord Chancellor of Scotland.

The Maitland Manuscripts 
The Maitland folio and quarto manuscripts are anthologies of poems compiled and authored by the Maitland family. The manuscripts are written in Italic and Secretary hands. John Pinkerton was the first to suggest that Mary Maitland was the scribe. Her name appears twice on the titlepage of the quarto manuscript. Some poems within the Maitland quarto name her, or are dedicated to her, including these lines in the Scots language;And thoucht adversitie ws vexYit be our freindschip salbe seinThair is mair constancie in our sexThan evir amang men hes beinAnd though adversity us vexYet by our freindship shall be seenThere is more constancy in our sexThan ever among men has been.

Scholarship by Sarah Dunnigan and Evelyn Newlyn has helped to bring critical attention to Mary, particularly in relation to these poems.

Family and relationships 
On 9 August 1586 Mary married Alexander Lauder of "Haltoun", or "Hatton", (buried in Holyrood Abbey 14 November 1627), Sheriff Principal of Edinburgh. Haltoun is an estate near Kirkliston. Alexander Lauder was a son of William Lauder (died 1596) and Jean Cockburn (died 1600). Jean Cockburn's aunt, Elizabeth Douglas, Lady Temple Hall, was a poet, working in the same circle of East Lothian poets.

Alexander Lauder with his younger brother got into trouble in 1596. They threatened Alexander McGill, the Provost of Corstorphine "under colour of friendship" because they wanted him to sign a contract.

Mary Maitland, Lady Haltoun's children included:
 Alexander Lauder younger of Hatton (died 1623), who married Susannah Cunningham, a daughter of the Earl of Glencairn
 Richard Lauder of Hatton (1589-1675), his younger daughter Elizabeth married Charles Maitland, later Earl of Lauderdale.
 Jane Lauder, who married (1) Alexander Hay of Smithfield, (2) Bryce Sempill of Boghauche and Cathcart
 Helen Lauder (died 1620), who married Thomas Young of Leny, a lawyer.

Mary Maitland died in June 1596. Soon after, Alexander Lauder married Annabella Bellenden, a sister of the lawyer, Lewis or Ludovick Bellenden of Auchnoule, and sister-in-law of the courtier Margaret Livingstone, Countess of Orkney. Annabella would be a stepmother for their young children.

George Lauder, a son of Alexander Lauder and Annabella Bellenden, was a soldier. He was a friend of William Drummond of Hawthornden and gained a considerable reputation as a poet.

References

External links
 Ashley Douglas: Marie Maitland’s poetry is a profound testimony to the power of queer love
 The Maitland Quarto and Poem 49

1596 deaths
Scottish women writers
16th-century Scottish writers
16th-century Scottish women writers
Year of birth uncertain